Christ Church, Crowton, is located in Station Road, Crowton, Cheshire, England.  It is an active Anglican parish church in the deanery of Frodsham, the archdeaconry of Chester, and the diocese of Chester.  Its benefice is combined with those of St John the Evangelist, Kingsley, and St John the Evangelist, Norley. The church is recorded in the National Heritage List for England as a designated Grade II listed building.

History

Christ Church was built in 1871, the architect being J. L. Pearson.

Architecture

The church is constructed in red sandstone, with a red tiled roof. Its architectural style is that of the 13th century. The plan consists of a four-bay nave and a two-bay chancel in one range, a transept and a vestry on the north side, a south porch, and a two-tier double bellcote at the west end.  The buttresses include a massive stepped buttress on the south side at the division of the nave and the chancel.  The windows in the nave have two lights, and those in the chancel have three lights.  Inside the church, the nave is divided from the chancel by a low wall and a double chamfered arch. The organ was built in 1871 by Gray and Davidson.

See also

Listed buildings in Crowton
List of new ecclesiastical buildings by J. L. Pearson

References

Church of England church buildings in Cheshire
Grade II listed churches in Cheshire
Churches completed in 1871
19th-century Church of England church buildings
Diocese of Chester
J. L. Pearson buildings